Sutphen is an unincorporated community in Dickinson County, Kansas, United States.

History
Sutphen is named after the town of Zutphen in the Netherlands. Sutphen had a post office from 1879 until 1905, but the post office was given the name Sutphen's Mill until 1894.

References

Further reading

External links
 Dickinson County maps: Current, Historic, KDOT

Unincorporated communities in Dickinson County, Kansas
Unincorporated communities in Kansas